Anthony Joseph Falkenstein (February 16, 1915 – October 10, 1994) was a fullback and quarterback in the National Football League.

Biography
Falkenstein was born on February 16, 1915, in Pueblo, Colorado.

Career
Falkenstein was drafted by the Green Bay Packers in the twelfth round of the 1938 NFL Draft and played with the team during the 1943 NFL season. He would split the 1944 NFL season between the Brooklyn Tigers and the Boston Yanks.

He played at the collegiate level at St. Mary's College of California.

See also
List of Green Bay Packers players
List of Boston Yanks players

References

1915 births
1994 deaths
Sportspeople from Pueblo, Colorado
Green Bay Packers players
Brooklyn Tigers players
Boston Yanks players
American football fullbacks
American football quarterbacks
Saint Mary's Gaels football players